John Martin Vesser (October 1, 1900 – March 20, 1996) was an American football player, coach of football and basketball, and college athletics administrator. He served as the head football coach at Idaho State University for nine seasons during 1941–1951.

Biography
Vesser was born in 1900 in Coeur d'Alene, Idaho. He played college football for Idaho, and was on the West squad for the inaugural East–West Shrine Game in December 1925. Vesser then played professionally for the Los Angeles Wildcats and the Chicago Cardinals.

Following his playing career, Vesser became a coach, first at the high school level, then joined the Idaho Southern Branch Bengals football team as an assistant coach in 1937. In 1941, Vesser succeeded Guy Wicks as head coach; the school was renamed as Idaho State College in 1947.

Vesser also served as head coach of the Idaho State Bengals men's basketball team for several seasons, and was athletic director at the college from 1952 to 1965. He was inducted to the North Idaho Athletic Hall of Fame in 1974, and the athletics hall of fame at Idaho State in 1979. Vesser died in 1996 in Pocatello, Idaho.

Head coaching record

College football

References

External links
 
 Statscrew profile
 

1900 births
1996 deaths
American football ends
Basketball coaches from Idaho
Chicago Cardinals players
High school football coaches in Idaho
Idaho State Bengals athletic directors
Idaho State Bengals football coaches
Idaho State Bengals men's basketball coaches
Idaho Vandals football players
Los Angeles Wildcats players
People from Coeur d'Alene, Idaho
Players of American football from Idaho